Grzegorz Skrzecz (25 August 1957 – 15 February 2023) was a Polish boxer, world championship medalist, actor, and the twin brother of Paweł Skrzecz. He competed in the men's heavyweight event at the 1980 Summer Olympics.

Career 

He was bronze medalist of the World Championships in Munich 1982 and bronze medalist of the European Championships in Varna 1983 and five-time Polish champion (1979, 1980, 1981, 1982, 1984).

Winner of the tournament for the "Golden Belt of Polus" (1976)

Throughout his career he was associated with boxing section of Gwardia Warsaw. After retiring from competitive boxing in 1986, he became a trainer.

In 2013 he was a judge at the Polish Championships.

In total, he fought 278 fights (all in the light heavyweight category), of which 239 victories, 4 draws and 35 defeats.

Death 
Skrzecz died on 15 February 2023, at the age of 65.

References 

1957 births
2023 deaths
Polish male boxers
Olympic boxers of Poland
Boxers at the 1980 Summer Olympics
Boxers from Warsaw
AIBA World Boxing Championships medalists
Heavyweight boxers
Polish twins